

Managers

Sources 
 
 
 
 
 
 
 ESPN Scrum Statsguru